Aberdeen School District is a public school district in Bingham County, Idaho, United States,  based in Aberdeen.

Schools
The Aberdeen School District has one elementary school, one middle school and one high school.

Elementary schools
Aberdeen Elementary School

Middle schools
Aberdeen Middle School

High schools
Aberdeen High School

References

External links
Aberdeen School District

School districts in Idaho
Education in Bingham County, Idaho